Somewhere Back in Time World Tour was a concert tour by the heavy metal band Iron Maiden in 2008 and 2009, focused on the band's 1980s material, in particular songs from Powerslave, Somewhere in Time and Seventh Son of a Seventh Son. The tour tied in with the second part of the DVD series, entitled "The History of Iron Maiden", and prompted the release of a new greatest hits compilation, Somewhere Back in Time.

The tour was advertised as a way of bringing back the 1980s stage show and forgotten "classics" for an audience of younger fans, not having been born in time to witness the original. Many of the band's songs had not been played in a long time, as much as 21 years in one case, and two of them ("Moonchild" and "Rime of the Ancient Mariner") never having been played by the current line-up. The stage set was based around that of the widely celebrated World Slavery Tour of 1984–85, featuring similar pyrotechnics and the return of the giant mummified Eddie, but also included a lighting rig and cyborg walk-on Eddie based on that of Somewhere on Tour 1986.

The tour would also see the first use of Ed Force One, Iron Maiden's customised Boeing 757, designed to carry band, crew and equipment across continents, which is piloted by the band's lead singer Bruce Dickinson, who also received the qualifications to flight the Boeing 757. The ground breaking nature of the tour led to the documentary entitled Iron Maiden: Flight 666, released in select cinemas in April 2009, followed by a Blu-ray, DVD and CD release in May and June, which would top the music DVD charts in 25 countries.

The 2008 tour was the second highest grossing of the year for a British artist, with the band reportedly playing to well over than 2 million people worldwide over both years.

Tour synopsis

The first leg of Iron Maiden's Somewhere Back in Time World Tour opened in Mumbai, India on 1 February, and continued through Australia, Japan, Los Angeles and Mexico, followed by concerts in Costa Rica, Colombia, Brazil, Argentina, Chile, Puerto Rico and New Jersey, before finishing in Toronto, on 16 March. Over the 45-day period the band played 23 concerts to over 500,000 fans in 11 countries, flying close to 50,000 miles in the specially refitted plane: Boeing 757, dubbed "Ed Force One" after a competition to name the plane. On this leg of the tour, the Iron Maiden: Flight 666 film was shot.

Concerning concerts in Scandinavia, EMA Telstar announced that the Iron Maiden tour will be the biggest rock tour that any band has ever undertaken in these Nordic regions. Tour promoter Thomas Johansson of EMA Telstar commented:  "We are all very proud to be making history by giving our rock fans the biggest Nordic Rock Tour there has ever been and certainly one of the most spectacular. Maiden is so hugely popular with the Nordic peoples that we wanted to ensure that as many fans as possible got the opportunity to see this very special show next year as we expect demand for tickets to be enormous.",

Maiden had also announced that they would be returning to cities that they hadn't returned to for years. Western Canada is included, as their five city run through Western Canada had sold out the very day they went on sale. Calgary and Regina had sold out in just under an hour. Edmonton sold out completely in a few hours. Winnipeg and Vancouver sold out within two hours. Calgary also had the highest pre-sale ever for the band, in which they sold out half the tickets. Edmonton and Regina were not far behind. Says Dickinson about the results: "We are truly overwhelmed by this response, especially as some of these cities we haven't played in 20 years!! Being Brits we are always very comfortable with Canadians and it will be a great pleasure to get back on the prairies again. It was always a LOUD response there! We look forward to this immensely and hope to give you all a show to remember."
Most recently they played at Madison Square Garden in New York City. Tickets to this show were sold out. During the performance of "Powerslave" the band's instruments lost power for a brief period of time and they passed time by playing football on the stage. Once the equipment was fixed they returned and asked the audience if they should play the last verse of the song or do the next one. The band opted to play the next song which was "Heaven Can Wait".
Due to storm damage to the PA and lights at the Metalway Festival in Zaragoza, Spain, Iron Maiden had to cancel their 12 July date. The Metalway Festival in Zaragoza could be rescheduled, but it seems unlikely that Iron Maiden can appear for their fans in Zaragoza.
The 15 March presentation, in São Paulo's Race Course, had Iron Maiden's all-time biggest attendance for them as sole performers (not a festival). Bruce Dickinson announced to the crowd that "100.000 fans" were at the venue.

Support acts
The opening bands on the tour were:
 First Leg: Lauren Harris, Vanishing Point (Melbourne), Behind Crimson Eyes (Sydney and Brisbane), Parikrama (Mumbai), Introspeciión (Bogota)
 Second Leg: Lauren Harris Anthrax (30 and 31 May only) and Trivium (Holmdel only).
 Third Leg: Lauren Harris, Within Temptation (London and Assen only), Kamelot (Assen), Avenged Sevenfold (from 1 to 31 July), Trooper (Bucharest), Made of Hate (Warsaw), Salamandra (Prague), Slayer (Lisbon and Mérida), Tainted (Christchurch), Rising Dream (Split)
 Fourth Leg: Lauren Harris, Carcass (Monterrey and Guadalajara), Atreyu (Monterrey and Mexico), Morbid Angel (Monterrey), Anthrax (Bogota), Loathsome Faith (Bogota), Abstract Enemy (Bogota), Ágora (Mexico City), IRA (Monterrey), M.A.S.A.C.R.E. (Lima), Witchblade (Chile)

Setlist
{{hidden
| headercss = background: #ccccff; font-size: 100%; width: 65%;
| contentcss = text-align: left; font-size: 100%; width: 75%;
| header = 2008 Setlist
| content = Transylvania/Churchill's Speech
Intro song to all shows on this leg of the tour.
"Aces High" (from Powerslave, 1984)
"2 Minutes to Midnight" (from Powerslave, 1984)
"Revelations" (from Piece of Mind, 1983)
"The Trooper" (from Piece of Mind, 1983)
"Wasted Years" (from Somewhere in Time, 1986)
"The Number of the Beast" (from The Number of the Beast, 1982)
"Can I Play with Madness" (from Seventh Son of a Seventh Son, 1988)
"Rime of the Ancient Mariner" (from Powerslave, 1984)
"Powerslave" (from Powerslave, 1984)
"Heaven Can Wait" (from Somewhere in Time, 1986)
"Run to the Hills" (from The Number of the Beast, 1982)
"Fear of the Dark" (from Fear of the Dark, 1992)
"Iron Maiden" (from Iron Maiden, 1980)
Encore
"Moonchild" (from Seventh Son of a Seventh Son, 1988)
"The Clairvoyant" (from Seventh Son of a Seventh Son, 1988)
"Hallowed Be Thy Name" (from The Number of the Beast, 1982)
}}

{{hidden
| headercss = background: #ccccff; font-size: 100%; width: 65%;
| contentcss = text-align: left; font-size: 100%; width: 75%;
| header = 2009 Setlist
| content = Transylvania/Churchill's Speech
Intro song to all shows on this leg of the tour.
"Aces High" (from Powerslave, 1984)
"Wrathchild" (from Killers, 1981)
"2 Minutes to Midnight" (from Powerslave, 1984)
"Children of the Damned" (from The Number of the Beast, 1982)
"Phantom of the Opera" (from Iron Maiden, 1980)
"The Trooper" (from Piece of Mind, 1983)
"Wasted Years" (from Somewhere in Time, 1986)
"Rime of the Ancient Mariner" (from Powerslave, 1984)
"Powerslave" (from Powerslave, 1984)
"Run to the Hills" (from The Number of the Beast, 1982)
"Fear of the Dark" (from Fear of the Dark, 1992)
"Hallowed Be Thy Name" (from The Number of the Beast, 1982)
"Iron Maiden" (from Iron Maiden, 1980)
Encore
"The Number of The Beast" (from The Number of the Beast, 1982)
"The Evil That Men Do" (from Seventh Son of a Seventh Son, 1988)
"Sanctuary" (from Iron Maiden, 1980)

Note:
In Belgrade, the opening date of the 2009 tour, "2 Minutes to Midnight" and "Wrathchild" were played the other way round. In addition, The drum intro to "The Trooper" was mistakenly played before "Phantom of the Opera", and the intro to "Wasted Years" was also played before "The Trooper". Only the first mistake affected the concert's setlist.
}}

Personnel
(Credits taken from the official tour programme.)

Iron Maiden
 Bruce Dickinson – lead vocals
 Dave Murray – guitar
 Adrian Smith – guitar, backing vocals
 Janick Gers – guitar
 Steve Harris – bass, backing vocals
 Nicko McBrain – drums, percussion
Management
Rod Smallwood
Andy Taylor
Booking Agents
John Jackson at K2 Agency Ltd.

Crew
Ian Day – Tour Manager
Steve Gadd – Assistant Tour Manager
Jason Danter – Production Manager
Bill Conte – Stage Manager
Zeb Minto – Tour Coordinator
Natasha De Sampayo – Wardrobe
Doug Hall – Front of House Sound Engineer
Steve 'Gonzo' Smith – Monitor Engineer
Ian 'Squid' Walsh – Sound Technician
Mike Hackman – Sound Technician
Rob Coleman – Lighting Designer
Rowan Norris – Lighting Technician
Sean Brady – Adrian Smith's Guitar Technician
Colin Price – Dave Murray's Guitar Technician
Mick Pryde – Janick Gers' Guitar Technician
Michael Kenney – Steve Harris' Bass Technician and keyboards
Charlie Charlesworth – Nicko McBrain's Drum Technician
Paul Stratford – Set Carpenter
Ashley Groom – Set Carpenter
Philip Stewart – Set Carpenter
Jeff Weir – Tour Security
Peter Lokrantz – Masseuse
Dave 'Tith' Pattenden – Video Director
Johnny 'TGD' Burke – Moving and Still Pictures
Keith Maxwell – Pyrotechnician
Eric Muccio – Pyrotechnician
Boomer – Merchandising
Dick Bell – Production Consultant

Tour dates

 According to sponsors and the Flight 666 documentary, the concert held in Costa Rica was the largest in Central America, with over 27,000 attendants.
 The Metalway Festival appearance was cancelled due to extremely bad weather.
 The European Leg was the biggest sales achievement in band's career. Most shows were sold out in rapid time and streams of tickets were officially extra added due to high demand. The band's performance at Wacken Open Air in 2008 was their largest festival performance of the year. According to Metal Hammer DE, "...not less than 83.000 metal maniacs from all over the world attended this show".
 On the Latin American Leg in 2009 Iron Maiden played 16 gigs to well over half a million people. Their show at Autodromo de Interlagos had the biggest attendance for a rock music event in history of the venue.

References

External links
 Official website
 Somewhere Back in Time World Tour Dates

Iron Maiden concert tours
2008 concert tours
2009 concert tours